Jurna Vas is a settlement in the hills south of Novo Mesto in southeastern Slovenia. The area is part of the traditional region of Lower Carniola and is now included in the Southeast Slovenia Statistical Region.

The local church, built on the southern outskirts of the village, is dedicated to Saint Margaret and belongs to the Parish of Podgrad. It was built in the early 18th century.

References

External links
Jurna Vas on Geopedia

Populated places in the City Municipality of Novo Mesto